Eva Strittmatter (née Braun; 8 February 1930 – 3 January 2011) was a German writer of poetry, prose, and children's literature.

Her books of poems sold millions of copies, reportedly making her the most successful German poet of the second half of the 20th century.

Life
From 1947-51, she studied German and Romance studies as well as Pedagogy at the Humboldt University of Berlin.  She married in 1950 and had a son, but soon she was divorced. Since 1954 she worked as a freelance writer. She met Erwin Strittmatter (1912–1994). They married in 1956 and had three sons, among them actor and writer Erwin Berner (born 1953). The marriage with Erwin Strittmatter enabled her to relinquish her maiden name, Eva Braun.

The marriage to Strittmatter initially overshadowed her own work as a writer, which did not unfold until she reached the age of 40. Following her husband's death in 1994, Strittmatter edited works from his estate.

Awards and honours
Strittmatter was awarded the Heinrich Heine prize of the Ministry for culture of the GDR in 1975.

Works

Poetry
 Ich mach ein Lied aus Stille, 1973
 Mondschnee liegt auf den Wiesen, 1975
 Die eine Rose überwältigt alles, 1977
 Zwiegespräch, 1980
 Heliotrop, 1983
 Atem, 1988
 Unterm wechselnden Licht, 1990
 Der Schöne (Obsession), 1997
 Liebe und Hass. Die geheimen Gedichte. 1970-1990, 2002
 Der Winter nach der schlimmen Liebe. Gedichte 1996/1997, 2005
 Landschaft, 2005

Prose
 Briefe aus Schulzenhof I, 1977
 Poesie und andere Nebendinge, 1983
 Mai in Piestàny, 1986
 Briefe aus Schulzenhof II, 1990
 Briefe aus Schulzenhof III, 1995
 Du liebes Grün. Ein Garten- und Jahreszeitenbuch, 2000

Children's books
 Brüderchen Vierbein, 1958
 Vom Kater der ein Mensch sein wollte, 1959
 Ich schwing mich auf die Schaukel, 1975

References

Sources
 Rengha Rodewill: Zwischenspiel – Lyrik, Fotografie. Together with Eva Strittmatter. Plöttner Verlag, Leipzig 2010, 
 Irmtraud Gutschke: Eva Strittmatter: Leib und Leben. Das Neue Berlin, Berlin 2008.  Rezension
 Leonore Krenzlin, Bernd-Rainer Barth: Strittmatter, Eva. In: Wer war wer in der DDR? 5. Ausgabe. Band 2, Ch. Links, Berlin 2010, .
 Beatrix M. Brockman: Nur fliegend fängt man Worte ein. Eva Strittmatters Poetik. Peter Lang, Oxford 2013. 

1930 births
2011 deaths
People from Neuruppin
People from the Province of Brandenburg
German children's writers
German women children's writers
East German writers
East German women
Writers from Brandenburg
German women poets
20th-century German poets
20th-century German women writers
Recipients of the National Prize of East Germany